Frederick William Ashworth (first ¼ 1907  – death unknown), also known by the nickname of "Basher", was an English rugby union and professional rugby league footballer who played in the 1920s and 1930s. He played club level rugby union (RU) for Aspatria RUFC, and representative level rugby league (RL) for Cumberland, and at club level for Oldham (Heritage № 246), as a forward, after retiring as a player he served Oldham as a member of the club's committee.

Background
Fred Ashworth was born in Aspatria, Cumberland (birth registered in Wigton district, Cumberland).

Playing career

Aspatria Rugby Union Club
Ashworth (or ‘Basher’ as he was known to his friends and colleagues) came to prominence when at the age of fourteen, he played in the local school team that won the Cumberland Silver Shield, a knockout competition open to boys aged sixteen and under. In 1924 the majority of the team were runners-up in the Cumberland Under 18’s Challenge Cup, after they were narrowly defeated by Silloth. In 1925, Ashworth captained the side that won the same competition, defeating Egremont by 11 points to nil. By 1925 he was a regular member of the senior squad and won a runners-up medal in that years Challenge Cup, when Aspatria were narrowly defeated by Workington.

In 1926, Ashworth, along with T. E Holliday signed professional forms for Oldham.

County honours
Ashworth represented Cumberland (RL).

Challenge Final appearances
Ashworth played in Oldham's 26-7 victory over Swinton in the 1927 Challenge Cup Final during the 1926-27 season at Central Park, Wigan, in front of a crowd of 33,448.

Honoured at Oldham
Ashworth is an Oldham Hall Of Fame Inductee.

References

Bibliography

External links

Search for "Ashworth" at rugbyleagueproject.org
Statistics at orl-heritagetrust.org.uk 
Search for "Fred Asworth" at britishnewspaperarchive.co.uk
Search for "Basher Asworth" at britishnewspaperarchive.co.uk

1907 births
Cumberland rugby league team players
English rugby league players
English rugby union players
Oldham R.L.F.C. players
Place of death missing
Rugby league players from Wigton
Year of death missing